S. M. Dorairaj was an Indian politician and former Member of the Legislative Assembly of Tamil Nadu. He was elected to the Tamil Nadu legislative assembly from Tiruvallur constituency as a Dravida Munnetra Kazhagam candidate in 1967, and 1971 elections and he was also first Treasurer of the ADMK party. He was elected from Ponneri constituency as an Anna Dravida Munnetra Kazhagam candidate in 1977 election.

References 

Dravida Munnetra Kazhagam politicians
All India Anna Dravida Munnetra Kazhagam politicians
Living people
Year of birth missing (living people)
Tamil Nadu MLAs 1967–1972
Tamil Nadu MLAs 1971–1976
Tamil Nadu MLAs 1977–1980